This list of tallest buildings in Asia ranks skyscrapers which are at least  tall. The tallest building in Asia (and the tallest in the world) is Burj Khalifa, which stands  and was opened on January 4, 2010, in Dubai, United Arab Emirates.

Nearly three-quarters of the 50 tallest skyscrapers in the world are located in Asia. Before the construction boom of skyscrapers in Asia since 1997, most of the tallest skyscrapers were built in North America. China has built fifteen of the tallest skyscrapers in the world in the last twenty years. The UAE has also built numerous skyscrapers in the last twenty years, and the city of Dubai has the most skyscrapers in the top fifty list.

The first list includes skyscrapers which are either completed or topped out according to CTBUH criteria. The second list those buildings which are proposed or under construction according to CTBUH criteria.

Tallest skyscrapers in Asia
This list ranks completed or topped out buildings in Asia that stand at least 273 m (896 ft) tall according to CTBUH criteria. Buildings that have been the tallest in Asia are shown in boldface.

Under construction, Approved, & Proposed

This section contains list of skyscrapers taller than  under construction or proposed according to CTBUH criteria.

On-hold
This list ranks skyscrapers whose construction is on hold that are planned to rise over 300 metres (984 ft).

Timeline of tallest buildings in Asia

Gallery

See also

 List of tallest buildings and structures in the world
 List of tallest buildings in Europe
 List of tallest buildings in Africa
 List of tallest buildings in Oceania
 List of tallest buildings in North America
 List of tallest buildings in South America
 List of tallest buildings in the world
 History of the tallest buildings in the world
 List of tallest residential buildings
 Asian Regions
 List of tallest structures in the Middle East
 List of tallest structures in Central Asia
 List of tallest buildings in Southeast Asia
 List of tallest buildings and structures in the Indian subcontinent

Notes
 A.  Destroyed buildings not included.
 B.  Topped out but not completed.
 C.  Topped out in 1992, when construction was halted. Work was restarted in 2008, exterior work completed in 2011; interior work ongoing.

References

External links

 Emporis, international database and gallery of buildings
 Structurae, international database and gallery of structures
 World's Tallest Skyscrapers, placemarks of skyscrapers for Google Earth
 The World's Tallest buildings list, including u/c and planned buildings, plus historical lists by decade

 
Lists of construction records
Tall